Cheyletiella is a genus of mites that live on the skin surface of dogs, cats, and rabbits.

The adult mites are about 0.385 millimeters long, have eight legs with combs instead of claws, and have palpi that end in prominent hooks.  They do not burrow into the skin, but live in the keratin level.  Their entire 21-day life cycle is on one host.  They cannot survive off the host for more than 10 days.

Cheyletiellosis
Cheyletiellosis (also known as Cheyletiella dermatitis)," is a mild dermatitis caused by mites of the genus Cheyletiella.  It is also known as walking dandruff due to skin scales being carried by the mites.

Cheyletiellosis is seen more commonly in areas where fleas are less prevalent, because of the decreased use of flea products that are also efficacious for the treatment of this mite.

Cheyletiellosis is highly contagious.  Transmission is by direct contact with an affected animal.

Presentation
Symptoms in animals vary from no signs to intense itching, scales on the skin, and hair loss.  The lesions are usually on the back of the animal.  Symptoms in humans include multiple red, itchy bumps on the arms, trunk, and buttocks.  Because humans are not a host for the mite, the symptoms usually go away in about three weeks. Though the medical community does not consider a human mite infestation a legitimate diagnosis, it will treat the symptoms if necessary.

Diagnosis
Diagnosis is by finding the mites or eggs microscopically in a skin scraping, combing, or on acetate tape applied to the skin.

Treatment
The most common treatment in animals is weekly use of some form of topical pesticide appropriate for the affected animal, often an antiflea product.  Fipronil works well, especially in cats. Cats can also be treated with a lime sulfur insecticide dip or a shampoo with non-pyrethrin insecticide for two weeks beyond the conclusion of symptoms.

In unresponsive cases, ivermectin is used.  Selamectin is also recommended for treatment.  None of these products are approved for treatment of cheyletiellosis.  Other pets in the same household should also be treated, and the house or kennel must be treated with an environmental flea spray.

Species
 Cheyletiella blakei Smiley, 1970 — infests cats (Felis catus), USA (Washington DC)
 Cheyletiella parasitivorax  — infests rabbits (Oryctolagus cuniculus), France
 Cheyletiella romerolagi (Fain, 1972) — infests Romerolagus diazi, USA (New York)
 Cheyletiella strandtmanni  Smiley, 1970 — infests hares (Lepus spp.), Taiwan
 Cheyletiella yasguri Smiley, 1965 — infests dogsC. yasguri and C. blakei'' can transiently affect humans.

See also 
 List of mites associated with cutaneous reactions
 Mange

References

Trombidiformes genera
Parasitic acari
Parasites of dogs
Parasites of cats
Parasitic arthropods of humans
Veterinary entomology
Parasitic infestations, stings, and bites of the skin
Cat diseases